Nasreddin in Bukhara is a 1943 Soviet comedy film directed by Yakov Protazanov, based on the novel by Leonid Solovyov Disturber of the Peace about Nasreddin.

Plot
Nasreddin arrives in Bukhara on his donkey. Exactly on this day the Emir of Bukhara administers a civil trial. Potter Niyaz owes 400 tenga to moneychanger Jafar and the court orders him to return the money within one hour. The poor potter has no money and this means that he will have to become a slave along with his daughter Guljan. Niyaz is saved by Nasreddin who buys out his debt from Jafar.

Indignant Jafar denounces this story to the Emir of Bukhara. Emir calls to catch the rebel who dared to leave his sentence without execution. Nasreddin flees from the guards out of Niyaz's and Guljan's house. But now Nasreddin's lover may become an addition to the harem of the Emir, and in order to save her Nasreddin dresses up as a scientist-astrologer and infiltrates into the palace ...

Cast
 Lev Sverdlin - Nasreddin
 M. Mirzakarimova - Gyuldjan
 Konstantin Mikhailov - The Emir
 Emmanuil Geller - Djafar
 Vasili Zaychikov - Niyaz, Gyuldjan's father
 Stepan Kayukov - Bakhtiyar, the wazir
 Matvei Lyarov - Arslanbek
 Nikolai Volkov - Hussein-Husliya
 A. Talitov - Yusup
 Asad Ismatov - Ali
 Ivan Bobrov		
 M. Mirakilov		
 A. Pirmukhamedov

References

External links

1943 films
1940s historical comedy films
1943 romantic comedy films
Soviet romantic comedy films
Russian historical comedy films
Soviet black-and-white films
Films directed by Yakov Protazanov
Films based on Russian novels
Soviet historical comedy films
Nasreddin
Russian romantic comedy films
Russian black-and-white films